Body Electric may refer to:

Literature 
 The Body Electric, a 1985 book on bioelectromagnetism co-authored by Robert O. Becker
 The Body Electric, a 1979 book on Kirlian photography by Thelma Moss
 The Body Electric, a 2002 book on cybernetics by James Geary

Music 
 Body Electric (album), by Steve Roach and Vir Unis, 1999
 "Body Electric", a song by Lana Del Rey from her 2012 EP Paradise
 "The Body Electric", a 1982 song by The Sisters of Mercy
 "The Body Electric", a song by Rush from the 1984 album Grace Under Pressure
 "The Body Electric", a song by Hurray for the Riff Raff from the 2014 album Small Town Heroes

See also 

"I Sing the Body Electric" (poem), an 1855 poem from Leaves of Grass by Walt Whitman
 I Sing the Body Electric (disambiguation)